WWPH (107.9 FM) is a student-run non-commercial high-school radio station licensed to the community of Princeton Junction, New Jersey and serving Mercer County.  The station is owned by West Windsor-Plainsboro Regional School District.  It airs a Freeform radio format. Programming includes music, news, student views, community information, sports, and more. The daily shows are podcasted on iTunes, and broadcast online. The webcast can be found at www.wwph1079fm.com.

The station was assigned the WWPH call letters by the Federal Communications Commission.

References

External links
WWPH official website

WPH
High school radio stations in the United States
Freeform radio stations